Kent Franklin Mercker (born February 1, 1968) is an American former Major League Baseball left-handed pitcher. He played for nine teams over his 17-year career.

Career
Mercker was born in Brownsburg, Indiana and lived in several different cities, including four years in Export, Pennsylvania, before his family settled in Dublin, Ohio in 1980. He was taken in the first round (5th pick overall) of the 1986 Major League Baseball Draft by the Atlanta Braves. He made his major league debut with the Braves on September 22, and appeared in two games that season. During his years with the Braves, Mercker split time between the bullpen and the starting rotation.

After the 1995 season, the Braves traded Mercker to the Baltimore Orioles. Mercker then became a journeyman, spending time with Baltimore, Cleveland (1996), Cincinnati (-, 2008), St. Louis (-), Boston (1999), Anaheim, Colorado, Atlanta (2003), and the Chicago Cubs. He signed with Cincinnati for the third time in his career on December 20, 2004.

Mercker received the Tony Conigliaro Award in 2000 following his recovery from a cerebral hemorrhage.

Mercker has taken part in two no-hit games during his career, both with the Braves. The first, on September 11, against the San Diego Padres at Fulton County Stadium, was a combined effort between Mercker, the starter, who pitched six innings; Mark Wohlers, who pitched the seventh and eighth innings; and Alejandro Peña, who pitched the ninth. The Braves defeated the Padres 1-0. The 13th no-hitter in Braves franchise history, attendance was 20,477 at Fulton-County Stadium.

The second no-hitter was a solo effort by Mercker, as he no-hit the Los Angeles Dodgers on April 8, 1994, at Dodger Stadium in a 6-0 victory. To date, this no-hitter is the last to be pitched by a Brave.

On February 8, Mercker signed a minor league contract with Cincinnati with an invitation to spring training. He pitched in 15 games for the Reds that season.  He currently works as a broadcaster for the Reds.

Mercker played in the 2022 Minto U.S. Open Pickleball Championships.

See also

 List of Major League Baseball no-hitters
 List of players named in the Mitchell Report

References

External links

1968 births
Living people
Anaheim Angels players
Atlanta Braves players
Baltimore Orioles players
Baseball players from Indiana
Boston Red Sox players
Chicago Cubs players
Cincinnati Reds announcers
Cincinnati Reds players
Cleveland Indians players
Colorado Rockies players
St. Louis Cardinals players
Major League Baseball broadcasters
Major League Baseball pitchers
Gulf Coast Braves players
Durham Bulls players
Greenville Braves players
Richmond Braves players
Buffalo Bisons (minor league) players
Lake Elsinore Storm players
Colorado Springs Sky Sox players
Dayton Dragons players
Louisville Bats players
Pickleball players
People from Brownsburg, Indiana